East China University may refer to:

East China University of Science and Technology
East China University of Political Science and Law
East China Normal University
East China Jiaotong University

See also 
 Donghua University